Garcihernández is a village and municipality in the province of Salamanca, western Spain, part of the autonomous community of Castile-Leon.

It was the location of the Battle of Garcia Hernandez in 1812, during the Peninsular War.

Geography

Economy
The basis of the economy is agriculture. Garcihernández has resisted the large-scale abandonment of most of the villages of the Alba de Tormes area due to urban developments in the 1990s in Spain. Many people from Garcihernandez worked in masonry in the capital, or elsewhere, in these years and stayed living in their own village. So the emigration stopped.

See also
List of municipalities in Salamanca

References

Municipalities in the Province of Salamanca